Meta-cold dark matter, also known as ''m''CDM, is a form of cold dark matter proposed to solve the cuspy halo problem. It consists of particles "that emerge relatively late in cosmic time (z ≲ 1000) and are born non-relativistic from the decays
of cold particles".

Notes 

Physical cosmology
Dark matter